is a name shared by two separate railway stations located closed to each other in Asakura, Fukuoka, Fukuoka Prefecture, Japan. The larger of the two stations is the eastern terminus of the Amagi Railway Amagi Line and is operated by the Amagi Railway (also called Amatetsu), a third sector public-private partnership corporation. Slightly to the east, about 150 metres away and just across a traffic roundabout is the northern terminus of the Nishitetsu Amagi Line which is operated by the private Nishi-Nippon Railroad (also called Nishitetsu).

Lines 

Amatetsu Amagi Station

Layout
The station consists of an island platform serving two tracks at grade.

Adjacent stations

History
On 1 April 1986, control of the station was handed over to the Amagi Railway.

Nishitetsu Amagi Station

Layout
The station consists of an island platform serving two tracks at grade.

Adjacent stations

History
The West Nippon Railroad opened the Nishitetsu Amagi station on 8 December 1921.

Passenger statistics
In fiscal 2011, the station was used by an average of 1,449 passengers daily.

Surrounding area

References

Railway stations in Fukuoka Prefecture
Railway stations in Japan opened in 1921